Blairingone is a village in Perth and Kinross, Scotland.

Schools

Blairingone Primary School is located in Blairingone.

History

Blairingone is located in the parish of Fossoway and is part of the former county of Kinross-shire. In fact it is the last village in the county of Perth and Kinross. The word "Gobhainn" is derived from Macgowan which is another name for "Blacksmith". All of these are based on the fact that in the Middle Ages and onwards the smiddy in Blairingone was a base for the serious manufacture of weapons of war. The twin forges being maintained by the easily obtained surface coal even then. The field behind the smiddy which was incidentally the site for the recent Lambhill open-cast mine, was the probable source of the coal which fed the forges that sustained this weapons industry.
This small settlement and area was historically a base for the winning of many valuable minerals. Materials like Limestone, Alum, Iron-ore, Whinstone & Sulphur as well as coal were mined here on a regular basis. History records that the Fossoway area and over into Fife contained the most ancient coal mining operations in Scotland. During the 1700s a waggonway complex included a track from Blairingone for carrying coal which also connected the North Fife coal fields and the limeburners at Limekilns on the Forth Estuary.
The monks from Culross Abbey obtained their coal from this area many years before this, and visiting nuns were accommodated at the still occupied "Ladieshall" on the Vicars Bridge road out of the village. Livestock drovers from the North and South passed through Blairingone on their way to the upper Forth ferry and were often known to take refreshment at one of the three Inns in the village, only one of which is left and was called the 'Devonvale Inn', In recent years renamed The Mart Inn.

See also

 Perth and Kinross
 Scotland

References

Villages in Perth and Kinross